The 1995 Women's European Water Polo Championship was the sixth edition of the bi-annual event, organised by the Europe's governing body in aquatics, the Ligue Européenne de Natation. The event took place in Vienna, Austria from August 18 to August 27, 1995, as an integrated part of the European LC Championships 1995.

Teams

Group A
 
 

Group B
 
 

Group C
 
 

Group D

First round

Group A

Group B

Group C

Group D

Second round

Group E

Group F

GROUP G (9th–12th places)

Semifinals

Finals
August 26, 1995 — 7th place

August 26, 1995 — 5th place

August 27, 1995 — Bronze Medal

August 27, 1995 — Gold Medal

Final ranking

Individual awards
Most Valuable Player
???
Best Goalkeeper
???
Topscorer
???

References
 Zwemkroniek (September, 1995)
 Coniliguria

Women
Women's European Water Polo Championship
International water polo competitions hosted by Austria
Women's water polo in Austria
European Championship
Water polo